Alberina Syla (born 4 September 1997) is a German-born Kosovan footballer who plays as a forward for Regionalliga Süd club Eintracht Frankfurt and the Kosovo women's national team. She played football as a child and her love of the sport helped her build a career.

See also
List of Kosovo women's international footballers

References

External links

1997 births
Living people
Women's association football forwards
Kosovan women's footballers
Kosovo women's international footballers
German women's footballers
German people of Kosovan descent